The Second Commandment refers to:

 The second of the Ten Commandments, which is:
 "Thou shalt have no other gods before me. Thou shalt not make unto thee any graven image" under the Talmudic division of the third-century Jewish Talmud
 "Thou shalt not take the name of the Lord thy God in vain" under the Augustinian division used by Roman Catholics and Lutherans
 "Thou shalt not make unto thee any graven image" under the Philonic division used by Hellenistic Jews, Greek Orthodox and Protestants except Lutherans

 The Second greatest commandment, to "love thy neighbor as thyself."